Tropical Depression One was the wettest tropical cyclone in Cuba since Hurricane Flora of 1963. The first tropical cyclone of the 1988 Atlantic hurricane season, the system developed on May 30 from an area of disturbed weather in the northwestern Caribbean Sea. The tropical depression headed northeastward, making landfall in La Habana Province, Cuba, without intensifying. Crossing Cuba, the depression became very disorganized as it emerged into the Straits of Florida and degenerated into an open trough on June 2. Although only a tropical depression, the system flooded central and western Cuba with over 40 inches (1000 mm) of rain, causing 37 fatalities, damage to over 1,000 houses, and the evacuation of about 65,000 residents.

Meteorological history

On May 31, Tropical Depression One developed in the western Caribbean Sea, a day before the start of the Atlantic hurricane season. The depression moved northeastward, passing just northwest of Isla de la Juventud before striking the Cuban mainland south of Havana. As it crossed the country, its strongest rainfall was east of the center, and the depression failed to intensify beyond winds of 30 mph (45 km/h). The National Hurricane Center never expected it to strengthen further, due to unfavorable wind shear. After a hurricane hunters flight could not detect a circulation, The depression degenerated into an open trough east of Florida on June 2.

Impact and aftermath

While crossing Cuba, the depression dropped heavy rainfall, affecting the provinces of Cienfuegos, Villa Clara, Sancti Spíritus, Camagüey, and Ciego de Ávila. At the time, it was the second highest rainfall total in the country, only behind Hurricane Flora in 1963, although Hurricane Dennis in 2005 later surpassed the depression. Rainfall reached 22.76 in (578 mm) in Cienfuegos and 21.90 in (556 mm) in Sancti Spíritus.

The heavy rainfall caused flooding in Camagüey that damaged about 5,700 houses and destroyed 200. The flooding also damaged 15 schools and hospitals, as well as several crop buildings. The floods left widespread areas without electricity or communications. Six bridges were destroyed in central and western Cuba, which, in addition to damaged roads and rail lines, severely disrupted the country's transportation infrastructure. A total of 131 roads were unpassable due to the flooding, and 55 rail lines were damaged. The flood waters prompted officials to evacuate 65,000 residents in low-lying areas, including using helicopters and amphibious vehicles. A tornado was reported in the city of Camagüey, destroying five Soviet planes and several buildings. By the day after the depression dissipated, the Cuban government reported nine deaths, although the death toll was later finalized at 37. The depression also killed thousands of livestock. Following the severe flooding, the Red Cross sent aid to the victims of Tropical Depression One in Cuba. The Red Cross had sent medical units, tents, blankets, and other necessary item to the victims by plane. Overall about 90,000 people were affected.

With most of the rainfall occurring east of the center, the depression did not produce significant precipitation in Florida.

See also

List of off-season Atlantic hurricanes
List of wettest tropical cyclones by country

References

1988 Atlantic hurricane season
01 1988
01 1988
01 1988
1